Gashowu was a Yokutsan language of California, spoken by the Gashowu Yokuts, or Casson.

See also
Casson
Yokutsan languages

External links
 Gashowu, California Language Archive
 Gashowu (Casson) Yokut tales
 Yokuts Languages, Comparison of sounds in Gashowu and other Yokutsan languages 

Yokutsan languages
Extinct languages of North America